Virginia Lawyers Weekly is a newspaper published in Richmond, Virginia, United States.

It reports digests of recent court opinions handed down in Virginia’s state and federal courts. The paper also covers legal news and publishes Verdict & Settlement Reports provided by lawyers in the Commonwealth.

The paper is published on Mondays, 52 weeks a year.

History
Virginia Lawyers Weekly was created and first published by  Lawyers Weekly Inc.; it began publication on June 9, 1986.  The paper started a companion website, www.valawyersweekly.com, in 1996.

In 2004, Minneapolis-based Dolan Media, Inc. (NYSE: DM) acquired the paper.

References

External links
 Official website

Mass media in Richmond, Virginia
Newspapers published in Virginia
Weekly newspapers published in the United States
Newspapers established in 1986
Legal newspapers
1986 establishments in Virginia